The 1905 Ohio State Buckeyes football team was an American football team that represented Ohio State University during the 1905 college football season. The Buckeyes compiled an 8–2–2 record and outscored their opponents by a combined total of 197 to 63 in their second season under head coach Edwin Sweetland. Denison forfeited their game on October 14.

Schedule

References

Ohio State
Ohio State Buckeyes football seasons
Ohio State Buckeyes football